Esther Scliar (28 September 1926 – 18 March 1978) was a Brazilian pianist and composer.

Biography
Esther Scliar was born in Porto Alegre, Rio Grande do Sul, Brazil, of parents Isaac and Rosa Scliar. Esther spent the first years of her life in Rivera, Uruguay, but her parents separated and Scliar moved with her father to Passo Fundo where she and her sister were raised by their aunt, Jayme Scliar Kruter. Scliar took piano lessons in Passo Fundo with Eva Kruter Kotlhar and Judith Pacheco. After her father remarried, she moved with him to Porto Alegre where she graduated from the American College and from the Institute of Fine Arts in piano.

After graduating, she taught piano and continued studies in composition at the Institute of Fine Arts, and later in Rio de Janeiro with H.J. Koellreuter and in Venice with Hermann Scherchen. In 1950 she attempted suicide, and later became a militant affiliated with the Communist Youth of the PCB.

Scliar worked as a pianist and taught harmony, music theory, analysis, and composition at the Instituto Villa-Lobos and Seminários de Música Pró-Arte. In 1952 she studied choral conducting with Nilda Müller in Montevideo and founded and was the first conductor of the Choir of the Musical Youth Association of Porto Alegre. In 1966 she wrote the music for the movie The Loss of Mario Fiorani and received an award for  "Best Song" at the Brazilian Film Week II.

In 1952 she found she had contracted tuberculosis, and in 1968 she had a stroke and left her position at Villa-Lobos Institute. Her father died in 1975, and she committed suicide at age 51.

Works
Scliar's compositions were often inspired by folk music.  She composed about ninety works. Selected compositions include:
1950 Ao sair da Lua for chorus
1952 A pedrinha vai for chorus
1953 Vira a Moenda for chorus
1953 Dorme-Dorme for chorus
1953 Beira Mar
1953 Maracatu Elefante (after a melody by Capiba)
1953 Papagaio louro (text: Geny Marcondes)
1953 Flor da noite (text: Geny Marcondes)
1953 Acalanto (text: Geny Marcondes)
1953 Oração à manhã (text: Geny Marcondes)
1953 Por sete mares (text: Geny Marcondes)
1953 Bumba meu boi
1953 Uma, duas angolinhas
1953 Romeiro de São Francisco
1953 Si quizieras que cantemos
1953 La Virgen de las Mercedes
1953 Toada de Nanã
1953 No Parque for children's chorus
1954 A Esquila for voice and piano - poetry of Laci Osório
1954 Novos Cantares with poetry by García Lorca
1954 Modinha with poetry by Langston Hughes
1954 Modinha with poetry by Juan Ramón Jiménez
1954 Eu plantei a cana
1954 João Pestana
1954 Boiadeiro
1954 Duas Toadas for solo piano
1956 Eu Fui Chamado pra Cantar no Limoeiro on a folk theme, for 4 voices, string quintet and piano
1957 Cantiga do Cacau for chorus
1957 Abertura
1960 Sonata for flute and piano
1960 Orchestration of A Marcha dos Deputados (music by Geny Marcondes) to Revolução na América do Sul, a documentary by Augusto Boal
1961 Sonata for piano
1962 Musical direction of Quatro Séculos de Maus Costumes, directed by Paulo Afonso Grisolli
1962 O Menino Ruivo for mixed chorus a capella, with poetry by Reynaldo Jardim
1962 Desenho Leve for chorus, with poetry by Cecília Meireles.
1963 Score and musical direction of As famosas Asturianas de Augusto Boal
1964 Canto Menor com Final Heróico for chorus, text: Reynaldo Jardim
1965 Lua, Lua, Lua for chorus, text: Lucia Candall
1965 Pachamana for chorus
1965 Para Peneirar for chorus
1965 Entre o Ser e as Coisas for voice and piano with poetry by Carlos Drummond de Andrade
1966 Music for the film A Derrota by Mário Fiorani
1966 Movimento de Quarteto for quartet
1971 Busca da Identidade entre o Homem e o Rio for chorus with poetry by José Carlos Capinam.
1973 Sentimiento del Tempo for mixed chorus with poetry by Giuseppe Ungaretti
1974 Ofulú Lorerê ê (after a song of Oxalá) for chorus
1976 Imbricata for flute, oboe and piano
1976 Estudo nº 1 for viola
1976 Praia do Fim do Mundo for chorus, with poetry by Cecília Meireles
1976 Toada de Gabinete for chorus
1977 Intermorfose
1978 Invenção a Duas Vozes for alto sax and piano

Books
Fraseologia Musical (1982)
Elementos de Teoria Musical (1985)
Análise de Density 21, 5 de Varèse (1985)
Solfejos Gradativos - Ed. Goldberg

References

1926 births
1978 deaths
20th-century classical composers
Brazilian classical composers
Women classical composers
Brazilian Communist Party politicians
20th-century women composers
1978 suicides
Suicides in Brazil